Min opera (Foochow Romanized: Mìng-kiŏk), also called Fuzhou drama (Foochow Romanized: Hók-ciŭ-hié), is one of the major traditional opera forms in Fujian Province. It enjoys a good popularity in Fuzhou, Middle Fujian, East Fujian and North Fujian where Fuzhou dialect is spoken, as well as in Taiwan and Indonesia, Malaysia, Singapore and Brunei. Having been evolving for 300 years, Min opera became fixed in the early 20th century.

A variety of Min opera called Beilu opera (also called Luantan), is popular in the Eastern Min region of Shouning County, near Zhejiang.

External links

Fuzhou opera video

Chinese opera
Culture in Fujian